KJKR (88.1 MHz) is a Christian radio station licensed to Jamestown, North Dakota. The station is owned by Hi-Line Radio Fellowship, Inc. and is an affiliate of Your Network of Praise.

History
KJKR began broadcasting at 10 p.m. on March 16, 2012, and was the student run station of Jamestown College. Effective May 8, 2019, the station was sold to Hi-Line Radio Fellowship for $20,000, and it adopted a Christian format as an affiliate of Your Network of Praise.

References

External links

JKR
Radio stations established in 2012
2012 establishments in North Dakota